Priestnall School is a coeducational secondary school in Heaton Mersey, Stockport, England.

History
The school was established in 1974 by a merger of Fylde Lodge High School, which was located in Priestnall Road, Heaton Mersey, and Stockport High School for Girls, which was located in Cale Green. Priestnall School took over the Fylde Lodge High School building. The Stockport High School building was subsequently used first by Davenport High School, then by Hillcrest Grammar School from 1983.

Fylde Lodge High School was built in the 1960s as an all girls school. It was still an all girls school at the time of the merger. Males were allowed to study at Priestnall School from 1987. Priestnall still to this day keeps some heritage of Fylde Lodge.

Colleges
There are five colleges, each of which is assigned certain subjects. They are as follows:

 Bridgewater  Maths, Computer Science, ICT and Business Studies
 Imperial  Geography and Science
 Rylands  Drama, English, History and Media
 Urbis  Technology, Beliefs and Values, Sociology, Ethics, Music and Art
 Victoria  PE and MFL

They are all named after Manchester landmarks – the Bridgewater Hall, the Imperial War Museum, the Urbis Building, the John Rylands Library, and Victoria Baths.

Notable former pupils
 Liam Broady – tennis player
 Naomi Broady – tennis player
 The Blossom Twins: Lucy Osterfeld (née Knott) and Kelly Sharpe (née Knott) – professional wrestlers formerly contracted with TNA Wrestling and former teaching assistants at St Winifred's Roman Catholic Primary School
 Kate Richardson-Walsh – England field hockey player

References

External links

Secondary schools in the Metropolitan Borough of Stockport
Educational institutions established in 1974
1974 establishments in England
Community schools in the Metropolitan Borough of Stockport
Schools in Stockport